The Royal Bank Building is a historic building in the downtown core of Victoria, British Columbia, Canada. It currently houses Munro's Books.

See also
 List of historic places in Victoria, British Columbia

References

External links
 

Buildings and structures in Victoria, British Columbia